was a  after Chōkyū and before Eishō,  This period spanned the years from November 1044 through April 1046.

Change of era
 1044 : The new era name was created to mark an event or series of events. The previous era ended and the new one commenced in Chokyu 5, on the 24th day of the 11th month of 1044.

Events of the Kantoku era
 1045 (Kantoku 2, 16th day of the 1st month):  Emperor Go-Suzaku abdicated; and his eldest son receive the succession (senso) on the same day. Shortly thereafter, Emperor Go-Reizei formally accedes to the throne (sokui). The following year, the era name is changed to mark the beginning of Go-Reizei's reign.
 1045 (Kantoku 2, 18th day in the 1st month): Go-Suzaku died at the age of 37.

Citations

General references 
 Brown, Delmer M., and Ichirō Ishida, eds. (1979).  Gukanshō: The Future and the Past. Berkeley: University of California Press. . .
 Nussbaum, Louis-Frédéric, and Käthe Roth. (2005). Japan Encyclopedia. Cambridge: Harvard University Press. . .
 Titsingh, Isaac (1834). Nihon Odai Ichiran; ou,  Annales des empereurs du Japon. Paris: Royal Asiatic Society, Oriental Translation Fund of Great Britain and Ireland. .
 Varley, H. Paul (1980). A Chronicle of Gods and Sovereigns: Jinnō Shōtōki of Kitabatake Chikafusa. New York: Columbia University Press. ; .

External links
 National Diet Library, "The Japanese Calendar"—historical overview plus illustrative images from library's collection

Japanese eras